Buster Keaton: A Filmmaker's Life is a 2022 book by James Curtis that examines the life of Buster Keaton. The book has six "positive" reviews, six "rave" reviews, and one "mixed" review, according to review aggregator Book Marks.

References

2022 non-fiction books
English-language books
Alfred A. Knopf books